In Riemannian geometry, a collapsing or collapsed manifold is an n-dimensional manifold M that admits a sequence of Riemannian metrics gi, such that as i goes to infinity the manifold is close to a k-dimensional space, where k < n, in the Gromov–Hausdorff distance sense. Generally there are some restrictions  on the sectional curvatures of (M, gi).  The simplest example is a flat manifold, whose metric can be rescaled by 1/i, so that the manifold is close to a point, but its curvature remains 0 for all i.

Examples

Generally speaking there are two types of collapsing:

(1) The first type is a collapse while keeping the curvature uniformly bounded, say .

Let  be a sequence of  dimensional Riemannian manifolds, where  denotes the sectional curvature of the ith manifold. This theorem generalized previous theorems of Cheeger-Gromov and Fukaya where they only deal with the torus action and bounded diameter cases respectively.

(2) The second type is the collapsing while keeping only the lower bound of curvature, say . 

This is closely related to the so-called almost nonnegatively curved manifold case which generalizes non-negatively curved manifolds as well as almost flat manifolds. The role that an almost nonnegatively curved manifold plays in this collapsing case when curvature is bounded below is the same as an almost flat manifold plays in the curvature bounded case.
 
When curvature is bounded only from below, the limit space called  is an Alexandrov space. Yamaguchi proved that on the regular part of the limit space, there is a locally trivial fibration form  to  when  is sufficiently large, the fiber is an almost nonnegatively curved manifold. Here the regular means the -strainer radius is uniformly bounded from below by a positive number, or roughly speaking, the space locally closed to the Euclidean space.

What happens at a singular point of ? There is no answer to this question in general. But on dimension 3, Shioya and Yamaguchi give a full classification of this type collapsed manifold.

Riemannian geometry
Manifolds